Shiravand (also Romanized as Shīrāvand) is a village in Suri Rural District, Suri District, Rumeshkhan County, Lorestan Province, Iran. At the 2006 census, its population was 287, in 57 families.

References 

Populated places in Rumeshkhan County